The PO-class consists of three small multi-role transport ships. They were built for the Yugoslav Navy by indigenous design made by Brodoprojekt Rijeka in the early 1980s at the BSO shipyard, Split, known as the Lubin class by NATO.

Characteristics
Displacement was  standard and  full load. The ship was fitted with a bow visor and bow ramp to aid loading and unloading of vehicles, with two slewing cranes on the upper deck. The main cargo deck could accommodate up to six small tanks like PT-76, while 150 fully armed troops could be carried in addition to the ship's crew of 43. Because of its RO-RO design it was possible to use ships from this class in their secondary role as Landing Ship, Tank. Ships where originally armed with defensive weapons. Ships that were sold were disarmed before delivery to new owners.

Similar class ships
 Kumbhir-class tank landing ship
 Ropucha-class landing ship
 Alligator-class landing ship
 Polnocny-class landing ship

References

Ships of the Yugoslav Navy